The following is an incomplete list of notable streets, roads, avenues, boulevards and expressways in the district of Nanshan, Shenzhen, Guangdong, China.

List

See also
Transport in Shenzhen

References

Transport in Shenzhen
Futian District
Luohu District
Nanshan District, Shenzhen
Nanshan, Shenzhen
Nanshan
Shenzhen-related lists